Geep may refer to:

Sheep–goat chimera, a chimera produced by combining the embryos of a goat and a sheep
Sheep–goat hybrid, a hybrid offspring of a sheep and a goat
A nickname for the EMD GP series of diesel locomotives

See also
Jeep (disambiguation)